Shikata (written: 志方) is a Japanese surname. Notable people with the surname include:

, Japanese singer-songwriter and composer
, Japanese chemist
Miiko Shikata (1925–2023), American actress known as Miiko Taka
, Japanese footballer

References

Japanese-language surnames